CAE may refer to:

Organisations

Aviation
 CAE Aviation, a Luxembourgian aviation services company
 CAE Inc. (formerly Canadian Aviation Electronics), a Canadian manufacturer of simulation technologies and training provider
 Régional Compagnie Aérienne Européenne, a former subsidiary airline of Air France

 Continental Aviation and Engineering, a US aircraft engine maker that later became Teledyne CAE

Education
 Centre for Adult Education, an adult education course provider in Melbourne, Australia
 Center for American Education (disambiguation), an old name for American-style institutions in countries including the UAE and India
 College of Advanced Education, a now abolished tier of Australian tertiary institutions

Engineering
 Canadian Academy of Engineering, the national academy of Canada for engineering
 Chinese Academy of Engineering, the national academy of the People's Republic of China for engineering, established in 1994
 College of Aeronautical Engineering, part of the Pakistan Air Force Academy

Science and technology
 Compressed air engine, a type of pressure pneumatic actuator using expanding compressed air
 Computer-aided engineering, the broad usage of computer software to aid in engineering analysis tasks
 Caelum (Standard IAU abbreviation), a constellation

Computing
 Common Application Environment, from X/Open Portability Guide, a specification for Unix-like operating systems
 Computer-aided engineering, computer software to aid in engineering tasks

Medicine
 Caprine arthritis encephalitis, a disease in goats
 Childhood absence epilepsy, a childhood seizure disorder
 Carbonic anhydrase enzyme, that catalyzes the interconversion between carbon dioxide and water and the dissociated ions of carbonic acid

Media
 Critical Art Ensemble, collective of tactical media practitioners of various specializations
 Radio Canadian Army Europe, Radio CAE, from World War II and the 1950s & 1960s, now replaced by Canadian Forces Radio and Television

Places
 Columbia Metropolitan Airport (IATA airport code), West Columbia, South Carolina, United States
 Central African Empire, a short-lived empire in Central Africa
 Caernarfonshire (Chapman code), historic county in Wales

Other uses
 Certificate in Advanced English, the fourth level of the University of Cambridge ESOL examination
 Chief audit executive, or Director of audit, a high level independent executive with overall responsibility for internal audit
 Child Abduction Emergency (SAME code), or AMBER Alert
 Canadian Arctic Expedition, 1913–1916, a Canadian Arctic Expedition